Looking for a Home is an album by American folk singer Odetta, released in 2001. It consists of songs written and/or performed by Huddie Ledbetter, better known as Leadbelly.

Track listing
All songs by Huddie Ledbetter, also known as Leadbelly, unless otherwise noted.
"Goodnight, Irene" (Leadbelly, Alan Lomax) – 4:59
"You Don't Know My Mind" – 4:32
"Mother's Blues (Little Children Blues)" – 3:47
"When I Was a Cowboy" – 3:12
"In the Pines" – 4:04
"How Long" – 4:30
"Bourgeois Blues" – 4:33
"Alabama Bound/Boll Weevil" (Leadbelly, Traditional) – 7:21
"Roberta" (Ledbetter, Lomax) – 5:36
"New Orleans" – 4:43
"Jim Crow Blues" – 3:18
"Rock Island Line" – 3:02
"Julie Anne Johnson/Whoa Black Buck" (Ledbetter, Traditional) – 2:48
"Easy Rider" – 5:11
"Midnight Special" – 4:36

Personnel
Odetta Felious Holmes – vocals 
Clarence "Gatemouth" Brown - violin
Henry Butler - piano
Richard Crooks - drums
Seth Farber – piano, organ
Freddy Koella - mandolin, violin
Mike Merritt - bass
Shawn Pelton - drums
Jim Saporito - percussion
Jimmy Vivino - banjo, guitar
Kim Wilson - harmonica

References

2001 albums
Odetta albums